Luis Alberto Riart Vera (21 June 1880 – 1 October 1953) was a Paraguayan politician and President of Paraguay from 17 March 1924 until 15 August 1924.

His Government

When Eligio Ayala renounced the presidency on March 17, 1924, Riart took charge of the government until August 15, and afterwards presented himself as candidate in the next elections.

His ministers were: Belisario Rivarola, in the Department of the Interior, Rogelio Ibarra in Foreign Relations, Lisandro Díaz de León in the Justice and Culture Department, Eliseo Da Rosa in the Treasury Department and Colonel Manlio Schenoni Lugo in War and Navy.

In education, he filled the empty seats in educational institutions with the help of Clementina Irrazábal and the Lieutenant Juan Manuel Garay.

In May 1924 the government recognized many teachers from the Escuela Normal of Barrero Grande and the distinguished teacher Pedro Aguilera was promoted to professor.  The careers of Public Translator and Consular were incorporated to the study program of the Escuela de Comercio (Business School).

Between 1906 and 1916 he was President of the Instituto Paraguayo (Paraguayan Instituto). In 1913 participated in the foundation of the Patriotic Union, from which he was in charge along with Emilio Aceval. He was in charge of the Instituto de Alta Cultura Paraguayo-Argentino (Institute of Paraguayan-Argentine Culture).

He was Minister of Finance of Paraguay 1916–1917, Minister of the Department of the Interior twice, Minister of War and Navy and Chancellor.

He was Provisional President of the country since March 17 until August 15, 1924. Being Chancellor, in 1935 he signed the agreement of Peace called Riart-Elio, that finished the border problem with Bolivia.

In 1913 he was member of the Comisión de Códigos (Code Commission); in 1916 he was Minister of the Department of Interior during the government of Manuel Franco.

Because he had some disagreements with Montero, he quit on August 25, 1919. On April 12, 1923 he was appointed Minister of Finance of Paraguay in the provisional cabinet of Eligio Ayala. In 1924 he was substitute in the War and Navy Department. In 1931 he was Minister of Finance of Paraguay. In 1931 he occupied that position briefly during the government of González Navero, until 1932. José Patricio Guggiari appointed him as Economy Director.

Between 1935 and 1936 he was State Secretary during the government of Eusebio Ayala.

On 21 July 1938 he subscribed with the Paraguayan delegation, the Agreement of Peace, Friendship and Limits with Bolivia. In 1939 he became Vice President of Paraguay in the cabinet of Marshal José Félix Estigarribia. Riart retired after the overthrow of the government on 18 February 1940.

Beginnings

In politics, Riart started more for duty than for personal satisfaction.

On August 8, 1904 he joined those who sought refuge in Argentina after revealing in the capital the beginnings of a movement that would end in armed confrontations. He participated of the union pact among the civics and radicals, being part first of the central commission of this group.

In 1928 he presented his candidature in the convention of his party, but lost by few votes.

References

External links
  List of Presidents of Paraguay, worldstatesmen.org

1880 births
1953 deaths
People from Corrientes Province
Paraguayan people of Catalan descent
Liberal Party (Paraguay) politicians
Presidents of Paraguay
Vice presidents of Paraguay
Finance Ministers of Paraguay
Foreign Ministers of Paraguay
Presidents of the Senate of Paraguay
20th-century Paraguayan lawyers